{{Infobox person
| name         = Abu Sufyan ibn Harb
| image        = 
| caption      = 
| birth_date   = 
| birth_name   = Sakhr ibn Harb ibn Umayya
| birth_place  = Mecca, Hijaz, Arabia 
| death_date   =  
| death_place  = Medina, Hijaz, Rashidun Caliphate 
| resting_place = Al-Baqi Cemetery, Medina
| spouse       = 
(among others)
| children     = Sons:Daughters'':
| relatives    = Muhammad (son-in-law)
| father       = Harb ibn Umayya
| occupation   = Major leader of the Quraysh tribe
| era          = 624–630
| module       = 
}}
Sakhr ibn Harb ibn Umayya ibn Abd Shams, better known by his kunya'' Abu Sufyan, was a prominent opponent turned companion of the Islamic prophet Muhammad. He was the father of Mu'awiya I and thus the forefather of all the Ummayid Caliphs. One of his daughters, Ramlah, was married to Muhammad, but this happened before Abu Sufyan's own conversion and without his consent.

Abu Sufyan was a leader and merchant from the Quraysh tribe of Mecca. During his early career, he often led trade caravans to Syria. He had been among the main leaders of Meccan opposition to Muhammad, the prophet of Islam and member of the Quraysh, commanding the Meccans at the battles of Uhud and the Trench in 625 and 627 CE. However, when Muhammad entered Mecca in 630, he was among the first to submit and was given a stake in the nascent Muslim state, playing a role at the Battle of Hunayn and the subsequent destruction of the polytheistic sanctuary of al-Lat in Ta'if. After Muhammad's death, he may have been appointed as the governor of Najran by Caliph Abu Bakr for an unspecified period. Abu Sufyan later played a supporting role in the Muslim army at the Battle of Yarmouk against the Byzantines in Syria. His sons Yazid and later Mu'awiya were given command roles in that province and the latter went on to establish the Umayyad Caliphate in 661.

Life

Early life
The family belonged to the Banu Abd Shams clan of the Quraysh, the brother clan of the Banu Hashim, to which the Islamic prophet Muhammad belonged. Abu Sufyan was among the leaders of the Qurayshi opposition to Muhammad in the years preceding the Hijrah (emigration of Muhammad and his followers from Mecca to Medina in 622). A prominent financier and merchant, Abu Sufyan engaged in trade in Syria, often heading Meccan caravans to the region. He owned land in the vicinity of Damascus.

Opposition to Islam
In 624, a caravan Abu Sufyan was leading back to Mecca from Syria faced an assault by Muhammad, prompting him to send for aid. In response, a 1,000-strong Meccan army led by Abu Jahl was dispatched. In the ensuing confrontation, Abu Sufyan, "by skillful and vigorous leadership eluded the Muslims", according to the historian W. Montgomery Watt. However, under Abu Jahl's command, the Meccans pursued a direct confrontation with the Muslims, which resulted in the rout of the Quraysh at the Battle of Badr. One of Abu Sufyan's sons, Hanzala, was killed at Badr and another son, Amr, was taken captive, but released. Among the other Meccan casualties were Abu Jahl himself and Utbah ibn Rabi'ah, who was one of Abu Sufyan's fathers-in-law. In the aftermath of Badr, Abu Sufyan was charged with avenging Meccan losses, the command he held likely being hereditary. Subsequently, Abu Sufyan inflicted significant losses on the Muslims at the Battle of Uhud in 625, but the Quraysh were generally unsatisfied with the battle's results. Two years later, he led the attempted siege of Medina, but was defeated by the Muslim defenders at the Battle of the Trench, and his morale may have taken a blow at this failure. The command of the Meccan forces were transferred to his Qurayshi rivals, Safwan ibn Umayya, Ikrima ibn Abi Jahl and Suhayl ibn Amr.

Conversion to Islam
Though Abu Sufyan did not participate in the truce negotiations at Hudaybiyya in 628, he held peace talks with Muhammad in Medina when allies of the Quraysh apparently broke the truce. Information about the results of these talks is unclear, but Watt surmises that Abu Sufyan and Muhammad entered into an understanding of sorts. When Muhammad conquered Mecca in 630, Abu Sufyan played a key role in the city's surrender, being among the first Qurayshi leaders to submit and guaranteeing protection for his partisans. He fought alongside the Muslims at the Battle of Hunayn against the Banu Thaqif of Ta'if, traditional rivals of Mecca, and the latter's tribal backers from the Hawazin confederation. During this battle, which ended in a decisive Muslim victory, he lost an eye, and was rewarded a relatively high percentage of the spoils to reconcile his heart. Because of his past trade relations with Ta'if, where he also owned property and had kinsmen, Abu Sufyan played a leading role in the dismantlement of the pagan sanctuary of al-Lat in the city.

Later life and death
Abu Sufyan was appointed the governor of Najran, in southern Arabia, either by Muhammad or more likely, by the first caliph, Abu Bakr. He initially opposed the latter's succession of Muhammad as leader of the nascent Muslim state. Abu Sufyan, seeing no hope that a member of the Banu Abd Shams could attain the role, aimed to keep the leadership in the hands of his next closest kinsmen, the Banu Hashim, specifically Ali ibn Abi Talib, a cousin, son-in-law and early supporter of Muhammad. According to the historian Wilferd Madelung, Abu Sufyan, by dint of his chieftainship of the Banu Abd Shams and the generosity he had received from Muhammad, was duty-bound by a tribal code of honor to offer Ali such support, as doing otherwise "would have been shameful". Ali, however, refused his support, citing Abu Sufyan's late conversion to Islam and the potential backlash from the Muslim community should he accept his backing. Western historians generally dismiss this episode as propaganda by the Muslim traditional sources, which were hostile to the Umayyads, the branch of the Banu Abd Shams to which Abu Sufyan belonged and which ultimately became the ruling family of the Caliphate in 661 until 750.

Abu Bakr ordered the Muslim conquest of the Levant, in which he gave the Banu Abd Shams a stake, despite their early opposition to him, which he sought to allay. Abu Sufyan's son Yazid was ultimately appointed to a leading command role in the conquest. Abu Sufyan was present at the Battle of Yarmouk, which resulted in a decisive Muslim victory against the Byzantines in Syria. His advanced age at the time renders it unlikely that he actively participated in the battle. According to an account cited by Sayf ibn Umar, he observed the battle alongside unspecified Arab sheikhs (chieftains), and accounts cited by al-Tabari further note that he "exhorted" the Muslim troops. His son Yazid held a command role in the battle and later died in a plague in Palestine in 639. Another of his sons, Mu'awiya, was appointed the governor of Syria by Caliph Umar ibn al-Khattab. Umar's successor, Uthman ibn Affan, shared descent with Abu Sufyan from Umayya ibn Abd Shams and was known to show special favor to his kinsmen. To that end, he symbolically honored Abu Sufyan, along with al-Hakam ibn Abi al-As and al-Walid ibn Uqba of the Umayyad line of the Banu Abd Shams, and al-Abbas ibn Abd al-Muttalib of the Banu Hashim, by allowing them to sit on his throne in Medina. Abu Sufyan died in 653 at the age of 88.

Family

Wives and children
 Ṣāfiya bint Abi al-As.
 Ramla (Umm Ḥabība). She first married Ubayd-Allah ibn Jahsh, by whom she had one daughter, Ḥabība bint Ubayd Allah. After Ubayd Allah's death, she married Muhammad.
 Umayma. She first married Huwaytib ibn Abd al-Uzza, by whom she had one son called Abu Sufyan.
 Zaynab bint Nawfal of the Kinana.
Yazīd.
 Hind bint Utba.
 Hanzala (killed in the Battle of Badr). Hind refers to Hanzala as her "firstborn".
 Mu'awiya I.
 Utba. He is said to have been born "in the time of the Prophet," i.e., after 610. He had a son named al-Walīd.
 Juwayriya. Her first husband was al-Sayib ibn Abi Hubaysh. Her second husband was Abd al-Rahman ibn al-Harith.
 Umm Hakam. She married Abd Allah ibn Uthman al-Thaqafi, by whom she had one son, Abd al-Rahman.
 Safiya bint Abi Amr ibn Umayya.
 Amr (taken captive in the Battle of Badr and later released).
 Hind. She married al-Harith ibn Nawfal, by whom she had six children: Abd Allah, Muhammad al-Akbar, Rabi'a, Abd al-Rahman, Ramla and Umm al-Zubayr.
 Sakhra. She married Sayyid ibn al-Akhnas and is said to have had children by him.
 Lubaba bint Abi al-As.
 Maymuna (Amina). She married Abi Murrah bin Urwa bin Mas'ud al-Thaqafi, and bore him a son, Dawud  and a daughter, Layla, who married al-Husayn bin Ali and bore al-Husayn his eldest son, Ali al-Akbar who was martyred in Karbala. Maymuna's second husband was al-Mughira ibn Shu'ba.
 Atiqa bint Abi Udhayhir of the Daws tribe.
 Anbasa.
Other children: Ḥārith, Al-Faraa, Azzah.

See also
Sahabah
List of expeditions of Muhammad

References

Bibliography

565 births
653 deaths
7th-century merchants
Banu Umayya
People of the Muslim conquest of the Levant
Companions of the Prophet
Medieval businesspeople